Stosicia garciai is a species of minute sea snail, a marine gastropod mollusk or micromollusk in the family Zebinidae. It is found in the Caribbean Sea.

References

 Rolán E., Fernandez-Garcés R. & Lee H.G. (2009). The genus Stosicia in the Caribbean (Caenogastropoda, Rissoidae) with the description of a new species. Basteria 73(1-3): 1-8

garciai
Gastropods described in 2009